Wendy Arons (born 1964) is an American dramaturg, drama professor, and critic who specializes in ecodrama and German translation. She is currently a Professor of Dramatic Literature in the College of Fine Arts at Carnegie Mellon University. She has written and edited many pieces for journals and is the author of the book "Performance and Femininity in Eighteenth-Century German Women's Writing: The Impossible Act" (2006).

Arons has increased artistic access in the theater world to German works: for example, she has translated Brecht's "Good Person of Szechwan" from German into English for an adaptation by Tony Kushner. She has also worked with Anne Bogart, one of the most influential artists of the 20th century.

Life and career 
Wendy Arons was born in Birmingham, Michigan. She attended Yale for her undergraduate degree. She then attended UC San Diego, where she earned her MFA in Dramaturgy, MA in German Literature, and PhD in Literature. Upon graduation, she worked with Anne Bogart from 1988-1989 and again in 1991. She also worked with Robert Falls on a production of "The Misanthrope" (featuring Kim Cattrall). In 1999 she joined the faculty of the University of Notre Dame as an Assistant Professor of Theater. While at Notre Dame, Arons published her book "Performance and Femininity in Eighteenth-Century German Women's Writing: The Impossible Act". After eight years of teaching, she joined the faculty of Carnegie Mellon University in 2007 as an Associate Professor of Dramatic Literature. From 2008-11, she served as the secretary of the American Society for Theatre Research. Notably, in 2012, Arons became the first person in the CMU School of Drama to win a National Endowment for the Humanities Grant. She will become the first person (along with her collaborators Sara Figal, Natalya Baldyga, and Michael Chemers) to completely translate G.E. Lessing's "Hamburg Dramaturgy" from German to English.

Today, Arons runs The Pittsburgh Tatler, a theater criticism blog, as well as working as the Professor of Dramatic Literature and Option Coordinator for the Dramaturgy program at Carnegie Mellon University.

Awards and recognition

Publications (selected)

References

American dramatists and playwrights
1964 births
Living people